One ship and a shore establishment of the Royal Australian Navy (RAN) have been named HMAS Madang, after Madang, Papua New Guinea.

, a base at Madang.
, an Attack-class patrol boat launched in 1968 and transferred to Papua New Guinea in 1974

Royal Australian Navy ship names